Orange County is a county located in the Piedmont region of the U.S. state of North Carolina. As of the 2020 census, the population was 148,696. Its county seat is Hillsborough.

Orange County is included in the Durham–Chapel Hill, NC Metropolitan Statistical Area, which is also included in the Raleigh–Durham–Chapel Hill, NC Combined Statistical Area. This had a 2012 estimated population of 1,998,808.

It is home to the University of North Carolina at Chapel Hill, the flagship institution of the University of North Carolina System and the oldest state-supported university in the United States.

History
The county was formed in 1752 from parts of Bladen, Granville, and Johnston counties. It was named for the infant William V of Orange, whose mother Anne, daughter of King George II of Great Britain, was then regent of the Dutch Republic.

In 1771, Orange County was greatly reduced in area. The western part of it was combined with the eastern part of Rowan County to form Guilford County. Another part was combined with parts of Cumberland County and Johnston County to form Wake County. The southern part of what remained became Chatham County.

In 1777, the northern half of what was left of Orange County became Caswell County. In 1849, the western county became Alamance County. Finally, in 1881, the eastern half of the county's remaining territory was combined with part of Wake County to form Durham County.

Some of the first settlers of the county were English Quakers, who settled along the Haw and Eno rivers. Arguably, the earliest settlers in the county were the Andrews family, which would later intermarry with the Lloyd family.

Colonial period and Revolutionary War
The Orange County seat of Hillsborough was founded in 1754 on land where the Great Indian Trading Path crossed the Eno River. This area was first owned, surveyed, and mapped by William Churton (a surveyor for Earl Granville). Originally to be named Orange, it was named Corbin Town (for Francis Corbin, a member of the governor's council and one of Granville's land agents), and renamed Childsburgh (in honor of Thomas Child, the attorney general for North Carolina from 1751 to 1760 and another one of Granville's land agents) in 1759. In 1766, it was named Hillsborough, after Wills Hill, then the Earl of Hillsborough, the British secretary of state for the colonies, and a relative of royal Governor William Tryon.

Located in the Piedmont region, Hillsborough was the site of a colonial court, and the scene of some pre-Revolutionary War tensions. In the late 1760s, conflicts between Piedmont farmers and county officers welled up in the Regulator movement, or as it was also known, the War of the Regulation, which had its epicenter in Hillsborough. Several thousand people from North Carolina, mainly from Orange, Anson, and Granville counties in the western region, were extremely dissatisfied with the wealthy colonial officials whom they considered cruel, arbitrary, tyrannical, and corrupt.

With specie scarce, many inland farmers were cash poor and unable to pay their taxes; they resented the consequent seizure of their property.  In addition, local sheriffs sometimes kept taxes for their own gain and sometimes charged twice for the same tax. At times, sheriffs would intentionally remove records of their tax collection to further tax citizens. Rowan, Anson, Orange, Granville, and Cumberland counties were said to be most affected by such corruption. It was a struggle of yeomen farmers and other mostly lower-class citizens, who made up the majority of the population of North Carolina, and the wealthy ruling class, who composed about 5% of the population, yet maintained almost total control of the government. Of the 8,000 people living in Orange County at the time, an estimated 6000 - 7000 of them supported the Regulators.

Governor William Tryon's conspicuous consumption in the construction of a new governor's mansion at New Bern fueled resentment of the movement's members. As the western districts were under-represented in the colonial legislature, the farmers could not obtain redress by legislative means. Ultimately, the frustrated farmers took to arms and closed the court in Hillsborough, dragging those they saw as corrupt officials through the streets and cracking the church bell. Tryon sent troops from his militia to the region, and defeated the Regulators at the Battle of Alamance in May 1771. Several trials were held after the war, resulting in the hanging of six Regulators at Hillsborough on June 19, 1771.

Hillsborough was used as the home of the North Carolina state legislature during the American Revolution. Hillsborough served as a military base by British General Charles Cornwallis in late February 1781. The United States Constitution, drafted in 1787, was controversial in North Carolina. Delegate meetings at Hillsboro in July 1788 initially voted to reject it for antifederalist reasons. They were persuaded to change their minds partly by the strenuous efforts of James Iredell and William Davie and partly by the prospect of adding a Bill of Rights. The Constitution was later ratified by North Carolina at a convention in Fayetteville.

William Hooper, a signer of the Declaration of Independence, was buried in the Presbyterian Church cemetery in October 1790. His remains were later reinterred at Guilford Courthouse Military Battlefield. His original gravestone remains in the town cemetery.

Several large plantations were located in this country in the colonial and antebellum periods, including Green Hill, Ayr Mount, Moorefields, The Elms, Sans Souci, Riverland, Alexander Hogan Plantation, and the Patterson Plantation.

University of North Carolina

Chartered by the North Carolina General Assembly on December 11, 1789, the University of North Carolina's cornerstone was laid on October 12, 1793, near the ruins of a chapel, chosen for its central location within the state. Beginning instruction of undergraduates in 1795, UNC is the oldest public university in the United States and the only one to award degrees in the 18th century.

19th century
The Reverend Robert and Margaret Anna Burwell founded and ran a school for girls called the Burwell School from 1837 to 1857 in their home on Churton Street in Hillsborough. Families of planters paid to have their daughters educated here.

When the Civil War began, Hillsborough was reluctant to support secession. However, many citizens went off to fight for the Confederacy. During the war, North Carolina Governor David Lowry Swain persuaded Confederate President Jefferson Davis to exempt some UNC students from the draft, so the university was among the few in the Confederacy that managed to stay open. But, Chapel Hill lost more population during the war than any other village in the South. When student numbers did not recover rapidly enough, the university closed for a period during Reconstruction, from December 1, 1870, to September 6, 1875.

In March 1865, Confederate General Joseph E. Johnston wintered just outside Hillsborough at the Dickson home. This house now serves as the Hillsborough Welcome Center in downtown (the house was moved from its original site in the early 1980s due to commercial development). The main portion of the Confederate Army of Tennessee was encamped between Hillsborough and Greensboro.

While camped in Raleigh after his March to the Sea,  Union General William T. Sherman offered an armistice to Johnston, who agreed to meet to discuss terms of surrender. Johnston, traveling east from Hillsborough, and Sherman, traveling west from Raleigh along the Hillsborough-Raleigh Road, met roughly half-way near present-day Durham (then Durham Station) at the home of James and Nancy Bennett. Their farmhouse is now known as the Bennett Place. The two generals met on April 17, 18, and 26, 1865, negotiating terms of Johnston's surrender. Johnston surrendered 89,270 Southern troops who were active in North Carolina, South Carolina, Georgia, and Florida. This was the largest surrender of troops during the war, and effectively ended the Civil War.

20th century
Occoneechee Speedway, just outside Hillsborough, was one of the first two NASCAR tracks to open, and is the only track remaining from that inaugural 1949 season. Bill France and the early founders of NASCAR bought land to build a one-mile oval track at Hillsborough, but opposition from local religious leaders prevented the track from being built in the town and NASCAR officials built the large speedway Talladega Superspeedway in Talladega, Alabama.

Chapel Hill, along with Durham and Raleigh, makes up one of the three corners of the Research Triangle, so named in 1959 with the creation of Research Triangle Park, a research park between Durham and Raleigh.

The Morehead Planetarium at UNC opened in 1949, when it was one of only a handful of planetariums in the nation. It continues as an important town landmark and destination for Chapel Hill. During the United States' Mercury, Gemini, and Apollo programs, astronauts were trained there.

During the 1960s, the UNC campus was the location of significant political protest. Prior to passage of the Civil Rights Act of 1964, protests about local racial segregation began quietly in Franklin Street restaurants; activists increased in influence and led mass demonstrations and civil disturbance.

Always suspicious of communist influence in the civil rights movement, the legislature passed the 1963 Speaker Ban Law, prohibiting speeches by communists on state campuses in North Carolina.  University Chancellor William Brantley Aycock and University President William Friday criticized the law, but it was not reviewed by the North Carolina General Assembly until 1965.  Small amendments to allow "infrequent" visits failed to placate the student body, especially when the university's board of trustees overruled new Chancellor Paul Frederick Sharp's decision to allow speaking invitations to Marxist speaker Herbert Aptheker and civil liberties activist Frank Wilkinson. The two speakers came to Chapel Hill anyway. Wilkinson spoke off campus, and more than 1,500 students watched Aptheker's speech across a low campus wall at the edge of campus, christened "Dan Moore's Wall" by The Daily Tar Heel, referring to Governor Dan K. Moore. A group of UNC students, along with Aptheker and Williamson, filed a lawsuit in U.S. federal court based on the right to free speech. On February 20, 1968, the Speaker Ban Law was ruled unconstitutional.

In 1968, a year after its public schools became fully integrated, Chapel Hill elected Howard Lee as mayor. This was the first predominantly white municipality in the country to elect an African-American mayor. Lee served from 1969 until 1975. Among other achievements, he helped establish Chapel Hill Transit, the town's bus system.

Geography

The county is drained, in part, by the Eno River.

The city of Chapel Hill, is in the southeastern part of Orange County, as is Carrboro. Hillsborough is in the central part of the county and is the county seat.

State and local protected areas/sites 
 Brumley Forest Nature Preserve
 Carolina North Forest
 Confluence Natural Area
 Eno River State Park (part)
 Historic Hillsborough
 Historic Occoneechee Speedway Trailhead
 Johnston Mill Nature Preserve
 Lake Michael Park
 Little River Regional Park and Natural Area (part)
 Mason Farm Biological Reserve (part)
 North Carolina Botanical Garden
 Occoneechee Mountain State Natural Area
 White Cross Recreation Center

Major water bodies 
 Buffalo Creek
 Cane Creek (Haw River tributary, left bank)
 Cane Creek Reservoir
 Eastwood Lake
 Eno River
 Haw River
 Jordan Lake
 Lake Orange
 Lick Creek
 Little River (Eno River tributary)
 Morgan Creek (New Hope River tributary)
 Mountain Creek
 New Hope Creek
 North Fork Little River
 University Lake
 West Fork Eno River

Adjacent counties
 Person County – northeast
 Durham County – east
 Chatham County – south
 Alamance County – west
 Caswell County – northwest

Major highways

Demographics

2020 census

As of the 2020 United States census, there were 148,696 people, 55,259 households, and 32,657 families residing in the county.

2010 census
As of the 2010 United States Census, there were 133,801 people living in the county. 74.4% were White, 11.9% Black or African American, 6.7% Asian, 0.4% Native American, 4.0% of some other race and 2.5% of two or more races. 8.2% were Hispanic or Latino (of any race).

2000 census
As of the census of 2000, there were 118,227 people, 45,863 households, and 26,141 families living in the county.  The population density was 296 people per square mile (114/km2).  There were 49,289 housing units at an average density of 123 per square mile (48/km2).  The racial makeup of the county was 78.05% White, 13.79% Black or African American, 0.39% Native American, 4.10% Asian, 0.02% Pacific Islander, 1.96% from other races, and 1.71% from two or more races.  4.46% of the population were Hispanic or Latino of any race.

There were 45,863 households, out of which 28.30% had children under the age of 18 living with them, 44.60% were married couples living together, 9.40% had a female householder with no husband present, and 43.00% were non-families. 28.10% of all households were made up of individuals, and 6.10% had someone living alone who was 65 years of age or older.  The average household size was 2.36 and the average family size was 2.95.

In the county, the age distribution was as follows: 20.30% under the age of 18, 21.00% from 18 to 24, 29.90% from 25 to 44, 20.40% from 45 to 64, and 8.40% who were 65 years of age or older.  The median age was 30 years. For every 100 females there were 90.10 males.  For every 100 females age 18 and over, there were 86.70 males.

The median income for a household in the county was $42,372, and the median income for a family was $59,874. Males had a median income of $39,298 versus $31,328 for females. The per capita income for the county was $24,873.  About 6.20% of families and 14.10% of the population were below the poverty line, including 9.00% of those under age 18 and 7.40% of those age 65 or over.  FY 2008-09 Orange County had the second highest property tax rate in NC at 0.998 per $100 of valuation.  For FY 2009-10 after the 2009 Orange County revaluation, the rate is now ninth highest in the state at 0.858 per $100 of valuation.

Law and government
Orange County is governed by a seven-member board of commissioners. The commissioners are elected to four-year terms by district and at-large in partisan elections, which are held in November of even-numbered years. Orange County is a member of the regional Triangle J Council of Governments.

Politics
Orange County has gained a reputation as one of the most liberal counties in North Carolina. The county consistently delivers one of the largest Democratic majorities in the state in presidential, state, and local elections. This trend predates the recent swing toward the Democrats in counties dominated by college towns. The last Republican to win the county at a presidential level was Herbert Hoover in 1928 – when opposition to the Catholicism of Democratic nominee Al Smith was a powerful force among voters. It has only supported a Republican two other times since the Civil War–William Howard Taft in 1908 and William McKinley in 1900. Since 1928, a Republican has only cleared 40 percent of the vote only five times, the last being Ronald Reagan in 1984.

Chapel Hill and Carrboro have a reputation for being two of the most liberal communities in the Southern United States. Carrboro was the first municipality in North Carolina to elect an openly gay mayor, Mike Nelson (who also served as an Orange County commissioner from 2006 to 2010), and the first municipality in the state to grant domestic-partner benefits to same-sex couples. In October 2002, Carrboro was among the first municipalities in the South to pass resolutions opposing the Iraq War and the USA PATRIOT Act. Orange County voted 78.98% against Amendment 1.  This was the highest vote against a constitutional ban on same-sex marriage of any county in the United States, even higher than San Francisco in 2008.

Education
The county is served by 2 school districts:
 Orange County Schools
 Chapel Hill-Carrboro

Media
Orange County is located in the Raleigh-Durham media market for both television and radio. The flagship station for PBS North Carolina, WUNC-TV, is licensed to Chapel Hill.

There are several radio stations located in the county. Stations licensed to Chapel Hill WUNC, WXYC, WCHL, and WLLQ. WQOK and WCOM-LP are licensed to Carrboro.

UNC Chapel Hill's student-run newspaper, The Daily Tar Heel, offers extensive coverage of news in Orange County.

Communities

Cities
 Durham (part, most of city is in Durham County)
 Mebane (part, most of city is in Alamance County)

Towns
 Carrboro
 Chapel Hill (largest town, most, small portions in Durham and Chatham Counties)
 Hillsborough (county seat)

Census-designated place
 Efland

Townships
 Bingham
 Cedar Grove
 Chapel Hill
 Cheeks
 Eno
 Hillsborough
 Little River

Unincorporated communities

 Blackwood
 Buckhorn (also known as Cheeks Crossroads)
 Caldwell
 Calvander
 Carr
 Cedar Grove
 Dodsons Crossroads
 Dogwood Acres
 Eno
 Eubanks
 Fairview
 Hurdle Mills
 Laws
 McDade
 Miles
 Oaks
 Orange Grove
 Piney Grove
 Rougemont
 Schley
 Teer
 University (formerly known as Glenn)
 White Cross

Notable people

 Alice Adams, author, who grew up in Chapel Hill
 K.A. Applegate, author
 Thomas Samuel Ashe, United States Congressman from North Carolina
 Lewis Black, comedian
 David Brinkley, newscaster
 Fred Brooks, computer science pioneer
 Larry Brown, basketball coach
 Cam Cameron, football coach
 William Carter Love, U.S. Representative from North Carolina
 Spencer Chamberlain, musician
 Elizabeth Cotten, blues singer who grew up in Carrboro
 Floyd Council, blues singer, the "Floyd" in Pink Floyd
 Butch Davis, football coach
 Sarah Dessen, author
 Elizabeth Edwards, an attorney and activist for liberal causes, Chapel Hill
 John Edwards, former North Carolina Senator, 2008 Presidential candidate, Chapel Hill
 Sam Ervin, former North Carolina senator, chairman of the Senate Watergate Committee
 Lawrence Ferlinghetti, beat poet, co-founder of City Lights Booksellers
 Ben Folds, musician
 Paul Green, playwright
 Andy Griffith, actor
 Mia Hamm, soccer player
 Harpe Brothers, Micajah and Wiley, America's first serial killers
 Bunny Hearn, major league baseball pitcher
 Jack Hogan, actor, noted for his role as Private William Kirby on Combat! television series, 1962–1967
 Laurel Holloman, actress
 Herman Husband, a leader of the North Carolina Regulator Movement
 Marion Jones, former track and field athlete
 Michael Jordan, basketball player
 Elizabeth Keckley, former slave and servant of Mary Todd Lincoln
 Charles Kuralt, longtime journalist with CBS
 Jim Lampley, sportscaster
 Howard Lee, pioneering politician
 Doug Marlette, cartoonist and writer
 Alexander Mebane Jr. (1744–1795), Revolutionary War militia general and U. S. Congressman
 Benjamin Merrill, leader in the Regulator movement and at the Battle of Alamance
 Elisha Mitchell, geologist
 Archibald Murphey, North Carolina politician
 Beverly Perdue, 73rd Governor of North Carolina
 Nick Perumov, author
 Mary Pope Osborne, author
 Frank Porter Graham, United States senator and president of the University of North Carolina at Chapel Hill
 David Price, U.S. congressman
 Connie Ray, actress and playwright
 David Rees, satirist
 Dexter Romweber, rockabilly roots-rocker
 Terry Sanford, United States senator and governor of North Carolina
 Stuart Scott, sportscaster
 Dean Smith, former basketball coach
 Lee Smith, author, lives in Hillsborough
 Oliver Smithies, 2007 recipient of the Nobel Prize
 Silda Wall Spitzer, wife of former New York governor Eliot Spitzer
 Chris Stamey, musician
 James Taylor, popular musician
 Lawrence Taylor, football player
 Manly Wade Wellman, novelist
 Daniel Wallace, author, lives in Carrboro
 Kent Williams, painter, illustrator and comics artist
 Roy Williams, basketball coach
 Thomas Wolfe, novelist
 James Worthy, basketball player

See also
 List of counties in North Carolina
 National Register of Historic Places listings in Orange County, North Carolina
 List of commissioners of Orange County, North Carolina
 North Carolina State Parks
 Occaneechi Band of the Saponi Nation, state-recognized tribe that resides in the county
 University of North Carolina at Chapel Hill, major university in Orange County, part of the UNC system

References

External links

 
 
 Orange County historic information cache
 NCGenWeb Orange County – free genealogy resources for the county

 
1752 establishments in North Carolina
Populated places established in 1752